Events from the year 1966 in France.

Incumbents
 President: Charles de Gaulle 
 Prime Minister: Georges Pompidou

Events
4 January – A gas leak fire at the Feyzin oil refinery near Lyon, kills 18 and injures 84.
10 January – L'Express publishes a story of Georges Figon, who took part in the kidnapping of Mehdi Ben Barka.
18 January – Police announce that Georges Figon committed suicide, prior to his arrest for the kidnapping of Mehdi Ben Barka.
7 March – Charles de Gaulle asks U.S. President Lyndon B. Johnson for negotiations about the state of NATO equipment in France.
11 March – President Charles de Gaulle states that French troops will be taken out of NATO and that all French NATO bases and HQ's must be closed within a year.
17 June – An Air France personnel strike begins.
20 June – President Charles de Gaulle starts visit to the Soviet Union.
30 June – France formally leaves NATO.
26 August – Riots occur in French Somaliland.
30 August – France offers independence to French Somaliland.
11 October – France and the Soviet Union sign a treaty for cooperation in nuclear research.
26 October – NATO moves its HQ from Paris to Brussels.

Arts and literature

Sport
21 June – Tour de France begins.
14 July – Tour de France ends, won by Lucien Aimar.

Births

January to March
17 January – Jean-Pierre Delaunay, soccer player and coach.
24 January – Julie Dreyfus, actress.
1 February – Laurent Garnier, techno music producer and DJ.
3 February – Jean-Jacques Eydelie, soccer player.
4 February – Guillaume Dasquié, journalist and writer.
28 February – Eric Dubus, athlete.
29 March – Stéphane Bré, soccer referee.

April to June
3 April – Rémi Garde, soccer player and coach.
19 April – Véronique Gens, soprano.
24 April – Pascale Paradis, tennis player.
26 April – Jean-Christophe Jeauffre, explorer, filmmaker and producer.
28 April – Jean-Luc Crétier, alpine skier and Olympic gold medallist.
11 May – Estelle Lefébure, supermodel.
14 May – Marianne Denicourt, actress.
17 May – Gilles Quénéhervé, athlete and Olympic medallist.
24 May – Eric Cantona, soccer player.
29 May – Natalie Nougayrède, journalist.
30 May – Frédéric Hantz, soccer manager.
14 June
Thierry Bonalair, soccer player.
Béatrice Mouthon, triathlete.
Isabelle Mouthon-Michellys, triathlete.
16 June
Patrice Killoffer, comics illustrator and writer.
Stéphane Traineau, judoka and Olympic medallist.
18 June – Catherine Fleury-Vachon, judoka and Olympic gold medallist.
22 June – Emmanuelle Seigner, actress.

July to September
1 July – Stéphan Caron, swimmer and Olympic medallist.
5 July – Laurence Ferrari, journalist.
8 July – Jean-Philippe Jódard, beach volleyball player.
15 July – Irène Jacob, actress.
4 August – Luc Leblanc, cyclist.
5 August – Gilles Delion, cyclist.
13 August – Pascal Lino, cyclist.
28 August – Christophe Galtier, soccer player.
31 August – Thierry Champion, tennis player.
2 September – Olivier Panis, motor racing driver.
3 September – Angelo Hugues, soccer player.
4 September – Biréli Lagrène, guitarist and bassist.
24 September – Christophe Bouchut, motor racing driver.
29 September – Laurent Chambertin, volleyball player.

October to December
10 October – Laurent Duhamel, soccer referee.
18 October – Thierry Lamberton, ice speed skater.
25 October – Lionel Charbonnier, soccer player.
6 November – Laurent Lafforgue, mathematician.
17 November – Sophie Marceau, actress.
19 November – Dominique Arnould, cyclist.
23 November – Vincent Cassel, actor.
30 November – Philippe Bozon, ice hockey player.
10 December – Benjamin Clément, soccer player.
20 December – Hélène Rollès, actress and singer.
29 December
Laurent Boudouani, boxer and Olympic medallist.
Patrice Rognon, judoka and Olympic medallist.

Full date unknown
Jean-Pascal Beintus, composer.
Catherine Dufour, writer.

Deaths

January to March
1 January – Vincent Auriol, politician, President of France (born 1884).
4 January – Marcel Tabuteau, oboist (born 1887).
6 January – Jean Lurçat, painter and tapestry designer (born 1892).
22 January – Jean Galtier-Boissière, writer, polemist and journalist (born 1891).
11 March – Jean Laigret, biologist (born 1893).
16 March – Jean Neuberth, abstract painter (born 1915).
31 March – Andre Richaume, archetier/bowmaker (born 1905).

April to June
13 April – Georges Duhamel, author (born 1884).
4 May – Amédée Ozenfant, cubist painter (born 1886).
24 May – Henri Barbé, communist (born 1902).
7 June – Jean Arp, sculptor, painter, poet and abstract artist (born 1886).
13 June – Pierre Chaumié, politician (born 1880).
19 June – Pierre Montet, Egyptologist (born 1885).
26 June – François Dupré, hotelier, art collector and horse breeder (born 1888).

July to September
14 July – Julie Manet, painter and art collector (born 1878).
29 July – André Spire, poet, writer, and Zionist activist (born 1868).
17 August – François Piétri, politician, Minister and diplomat (born 1882).
18 August – Louis Renou, indologist (born 1896).
14 September – Alexandre Bioussa, rugby union player (born 1901).
21 September – Paul Reynaud, politician and lawyer (born 1878).
28 September – André Breton, writer, poet, and surrealist theorist (born 1896).

October to December
6 October – Pierre Couderc, screenwriter, actor, acrobat and film producer (born 1896).
8 October – Célestin Freinet, pedagogue, and educational reformer (born 1896).
10 October
Robert Desoille, psychotherapist (born 1890).
Louise Thuliez, resistance fighter in World War I and World War II (born 1881)
17 October – Cléo de Mérode, dancer (born 1875).
28 October – Robert Charpentier, cyclist and Olympic gold medallist (born 1916).

Full date unknown
Charles Catteau, industrial designer (born 1880).
Frédéric Justin Collet, pathologist and otolaryngologist (born 1870).
Louis Couffignal, mathematician and cybernetics pioneer (born 1902).
Edmond Locard, pioneer in forensic science (born 1877).

See also
 List of French films of 1966

References

1960s in France